The Northumberland Senior Plate is an annual rugby union competition held between the clubs of the Northumberland RFU which was first played for during the 2001-2002 season.  It is the second tier county cup for the Northumberland Rugby Union, which includes Newcastle upon Tyne, North Tyneside, and Northumberland.

The plate was originally introduced in 2001-2002 for the first round losers in the Northumberland Senior Cup when it was clear some clubs would not reach the latter rounds of the Cup. Since then the competition has undergone various changes. The competition is now open to the 9th-16th best placed clubs in the league pyramid. The current holders are Medicals who defeated Alnwick II 32-26, in the 2022 cup final. All Senior Plate Finals have been played at various venues in the county and takes place on Easter Saturday.

The Senior Plate is currently the second most important county cup competition for club sides based in Northumberland and Tyne and Wear typically competing at tier 7 (Durham/Northumberland 1), tier 8 (Durham/Northumberland 2) and tier 9 (Durham/Northumberland 3) of the English rugby union system. The format is a knock-out cup with a quarter-final, semi-final and final, which is to be played at a neutral ground in April.

Northumberland Senior Plate Winners

By number of wins (clubs)

Notes

References

Rugby union cup competitions in England
Rugby union in Northumberland
Recurring sporting events established in 2002